Polibek ("Kiss") is a protected statue by Josef Mařatka, installed on the hill of Petřín in Prague, Czech Republic.

References

External links

 

Outdoor sculptures in Prague
Petřín
Sculptures of men in Prague
Sculptures of women in Prague
Statues in Prague